is a city in Aichi Prefecture, Japan. , the city had an estimated population of 57,872 in 24,872 households, and a population density of 1,035 persons per km².

Geography

Tokoname is located on the western coast of the Chita Peninsula in southern Aichi Prefecture, facing Ise Bay.

Climate
The city has a climate characterized by hot and humid summers, and relatively mild winters (Köppen climate classification Cfa).  The average annual temperature in Tokoname is 15.5 °C. The average annual rainfall is 1674 mm with September as the wettest month. The temperatures are highest on average in August, at around 27.4 °C, and lowest in January, at around 4.6 °C.

Demographics
Per Japanese census data, the population of Tokoname has been relatively steady over the past 50 years.

Neighboring municipalities
Aichi Prefecture
Chita
Agui
Mihama
Handa
Taketoyo

History

Ancient history
Tokoname has been associated with ceramics production since at least the Heian period, and Tokoname-yaki works from this period have been found in locations as far away as Aomori Prefecture in the north of Japan and Kagoshima prefecture in the south.

Middle Ages
By the Kamakura period, over 3000 kilns were active.
During the Sengoku period, the area came under the control of the Isshiki clan, and later came under the rule of Oda Nobunaga and Toyotomi Hideyoshi.

Early modern period
During the Edo period, the area around present-day Tokoname was part of Owari Domain.

Late modern period
In the post Meiji Restoration cadastral reforms of 1889, the town of Tokoname was created with the establishment of the modern municipalities system.

Contemporary history
Tokoname was elevated to city status on April 1, 1954, by the merger of Tokoname town with the towns of Onizaki (鬼崎), Nishiura (西浦) and Ōno (大野), and the village of Miwa (三和村).

Government

Tokoname has a mayor-council form of government with a directly elected mayor and a unicameral city legislature of 18 members. The city contributes one member to the Aichi Prefectural Assembly.  In terms of national politics, the city is part of Aichi District 8 of the lower house of the Diet of Japan.

Chubu Centrair International Airport, built on an artificial island off the coast of Tokoname, opened on February 17, 2005, providing a major boost to local development.

External relations

Twin towns – sister cities

International
Friendship city
Yixing（Jiangsu, China）
since April 25, 2018

Economy

Secondary sector of the economy

Ceramic engineering
Tokoname is a regional commercial center, and has been known since the Heian period for its production of ceramics, notably Tokoname-yaki, and ceramics production remains the mainstay of the local economy. 
One of the main producing companies is INAX.

About 60 climbing kilns formerly operated, most of which were constructed starting in the Meiji era. The chimneys became a landmark of the town, but many were closed and taken down after the Second World War as production methods modernised and burning of ovens was regulated by the authorities to protect the air quality. The Tōei Kiln (陶栄窯) is a climbing kiln (nobori-gama) that was constructed in 887 and used until 1974. It is the largest climbing kiln existing in Japan. It was designated as an Important Tangible Cultural Property by the government in 1982. It has eight firing chambers running a 17° incline and ten chimneys of varying height.

With its long coastline, commercial fishing also plays an important role in the local economy.

Education
Tokoname has nine public elementary schools, four public junior high schools operated by the city government, and one public high school operated by the Aichi Prefectural Board of Education.

High school
 Tokoname Senior High School

Junior high schools
 Tokoname Junior High School
 Onizaki Junior High School
 Nanryo Junior High School
 Seikai Junior High School

Elementary schools
 Miwa Elementary School
 Ono Elementary School
 Onizaki North Elementary School
 Onizaki South Elementary School
 Tokoname West Elementary School
 Tokoname East Elementary School
 Nishiura North Elementary School
 Nishiura South Elementary School
 Kosugaya Elementary School

Transportation

Airways

Airport
Chūbu Centrair International Airport

Railways

Conventional lines
 Meitetsu
Tokoname Line：-  –  –  –  –  – 
Airport Line： –  –

Buses

Bus services
Chita Bus (Chita Noriai)
 Kariya-Central Japan International Airport Route
 Chiryu – Kariya – Ogawa – Central Japan International Airport
 Tokoname Route
 Chintahanda – Narawabashi – Tokoname – Central Japan International Airport /- RinkuTokoname – Tokoname – Tokoname Public Hospital
 Tokoname South Route
 Kaminomae – Tokoname – *Central Japan International Airport/ – RinkuTokoname – Tokoname – Tokoname Public Hospital 
 *All passengers going to Central Japan International Airport need to get a transfer ticket and change to Tokoname Route Services at Tokoname Station.
Tokoname City North Bus
 Tokoname Municipal Government – Tokoname – Tokoname Public Hospital – YadaCentral – Ogura Public Hall

Roads

Expressway
 Chitaōdan Road　(Tollroad)
 Chubu International Airport Connecting Road (Tollroad)

Japan National Route

Local attractions
Inax Museum
Akio Morita Library
Ōno Castle

Notable people from Tokoname
Tetsuzō Tanikawa, philosopher, father of Shuntarō Tanikawa
Kotaro Suzumura, economist
The Peanuts, singers
Tatsutoshi Goto, professional wrestler
Tetsu Watanabe, actor
Shibayama Tomotaka, anime director of the 2020 A Whisker Away, which takes place in Tokoname

References

External links

   (with link to pages in English)

 
Cities in Aichi Prefecture
Populated coastal places in Japan